Borislav Jovanović may refer to:

 Borislav Jovanović (writer) (born 1941), Montenegrin writer, poet and literary critic
 Borislav Jovanović (footballer) (born 1986), Serbian football player